Alexis J. G. FitzGerald (7 May 1945 – 15 July 2015) was an Irish Fine Gael politician who served as a TD and Senator in the 1980s.

FitzGerald stood unsuccessfully for Dáil Éireann at the 1973 general election in Dublin Central, at the 1977 general election in Dublin South-Central, and at the 1981 general election in Dublin South.

FitzGerald then contested the 1981 Seanad election on the Industrial and Commercial Panel, and was returned to the 15th Seanad replacing his uncle Alexis FitzGerald Snr. In the same year he was elected Lord Mayor of Dublin.

FitzGerald was finally elected to the Dáil at the February 1982 general election, when he replaced the retiring Fine Gael TD Richie Ryan as a running-mate of party leader Garret FitzGerald (no relation) in the Dublin South-East constituency. He took his seat in the 23rd Dáil as a minority Fianna Fáil government took office under Charles Haughey, but after Haughey's government fell later that year, FitzGerald lost his Dáil seat to his Fine Gael colleague Joe Doyle at the November 1982 general election.

After his Dáil defeat, he stood again for election to the Seanad on the Industrial and Commercial Panel and was elected to the 17th Seanad. He left the Seanad at the next election in 1987 and returned to his previous career as an auctioneer and estate agent.

FitzGerald and his wife Mary Flaherty were both members of the 23rd Dáil, one of the few married couples to sit in the same Dáil.

He died in July 2015 at the age of 70.

See also
Families in the Oireachtas

References

 

1945 births
2015 deaths
Fine Gael TDs
Lord Mayors of Dublin
Members of the 15th Seanad
Members of the 23rd Dáil
Members of the 17th Seanad
Politicians from County Dublin
Spouses of Irish politicians
Fine Gael senators